The Qasr el Sagha Formation is a geological formation located in Egypt. The formation is part of the Wadi El Hitan World Heritage Site. The Qasr el Sagha Formation overlies the Birket Qarun Formation and is overlain by the Gebel Qatrani Formation. The sandstones and shales of the formation were deposited in a deltaic to shallow marine environment. It dates to the Late Eocene (middle Priabonian).

Paleontological significance 

Fossils of the early whale genus Saghacetus ("Sagha whale", originally named "Zeuglodon osiris") were first collected at Qasr al Sagha by German explorer Georg August Schweinfurth in January 1886 (a well-preserved dentary).Saghacetus is common in the middle of Qasr el Sagha, but there are few other specimens of archaeocetes whales; the only exception being the enigmatic "Prozeuglodon stromeri", named in 1828 based on specimens from 1904, but never adequately described before their destruction during the bombing of Munich in World War II.

Other fossils found in the formation include:

Mammals

Afrotheres

Ferae

Ungulates

Reptiles

Squamates

Testudines

Fish
 Misrichthys stromeri
 Carcharhinus aff. frequens
 Odontorhytis aff. pappenheimi
 ?Jacquhermania attiai
 Carcharhinus sp.
 Coupatezia sp.
 Ouledia sp.
 Pastinachus sp.
 Rhinobatos sp.
 Scyliorhinus sp.
 ?Sphyrna sp.
 Pristidae indet.
 "Cretolamna" twiggsensis

See also 
 List of fossil sites

References

Bibliography 
    

 A. Pérez-García. 2019. New information and establishment of a new genus for the Egyptian Paleogene turtle ‘Stereogenys’ libyca (Podocnemididae, Erymnochelyinae). Historical Biology 31(3):383-392
 S. Adnet, H. Cappetta, S. Elnahas and A. Strougo. 2011. A new Priabonian Chondrichthyans assemblage from the Western desert, Egypt: Correlation with the Fayum oasis. Journal of African Earth Sciences 61:27-37
 
 

Geologic formations of Egypt
Eocene Series of Africa
Priabonian Stage
Sandstone formations
Mudstone formations
Deltaic deposits
Shallow marine deposits
Fossiliferous stratigraphic units of Africa
Paleontology in Egypt